Conley Trigg Snidow Jr. (April 26, 1916 – October 6, 2007) was an American football and basketball coach and college athletics administrator.  He served as the head football coach at Emory and Henry College from 1948 to 1952 and at Wofford College from 1953 to 1966, compiling a career college football coaching record of 117–71–5.  Snidow was the head basketball coach at Emory and Henry from 1948 to 1953, tallying a mark of 70–51.  He served as the athletic director at Wofford from 1953 to 1971.  Snidow played college football at Roanoke College from 1935 to 1937.

Snidow was born on April 26, 1916 in Princeton, West Virginia.  He died on October 6, 2007 in Midlothian, Virginia.

Head coaching record

College football

References

External links
 

1916 births
2007 deaths
Basketball coaches from West Virginia
Emory and Henry Wasps football coaches
Emory and Henry Wasps men's basketball coaches
Roanoke Maroons football players
Wofford Terriers athletic directors
Wofford Terriers football coaches
High school football coaches in Virginia
People from Princeton, West Virginia
Players of American football from  West Virginia